Oscillatoria willei is a species of bacteria that is able to photosynthesize to make food, similarly to plants.

Anatomy
Bacteria of the genus Oscillatoria occur in rows of cells of similar size. They form filaments called trichomes. Many trichomes are enveloped in a firm casing, but in this genus the casing is almost non-existent. This gives the filaments easier mobility in all directions.

Nitrogen fixing ability
This species of Oscillatoria is able to fix nitrogen, but unlike other bacteria, it is uncertain whether or not it has cells specialized for that particular purpose.

Hormogonia
Fragments of filaments of Oscillatoria willei are called hormogonia. They consist of dozens of cells, which sometimes break off to reproduce by establishing new colonies.

Danger to Humans
Like all species of Oscillatoria, this species can cause skin irritation in humans who come in close contact with them in the tropics.

References

Oscillatoriales